This is a complete list of musical compositions by James Scott (February 12, 1885 – August 30, 1938).  James Scott was one of the three leading composers of ragtime.

African-American music
Scott, James
Scott, James